Walter Mitchell may refer to:

Wally Mitchell (1908–1974), Australian rules footballer who played with Fitzroy
Walter Mitchell (2013 character), fictional character from Neighbours introduced in 2013
Walter Mitchell (2016 character), fictional character from Neighbours introduced in 2016
Walter Mitchell (politician), mayor of Halifax, Nova Scotia, 1937–40
Walter Mitchell (bishop) (died 1971), Missionary Bishop of Arizona
Walter George Mitchell (1877–1935), Canadian lawyer and politician